The 2016 season is Chonburi's 11th season in the Thai Premier League of Chonburi Football Club.

Players

Foreign Players

Pre-season and friendlies

Thai League
Toyota Thai League

League table

AFC Champions League

Thai FA Cup
Chang FA Cup

Thai League Cup
Toyota League Cup

Squad goals statistics

Transfers
First Thai footballer's market is opening on December 14, 2015 to January 28, 2016
Second Thai footballer's market is opening on June 3, 2016 to June 30, 2016

In

Out

Loan in

Loan out

Notes

External links
 Official Website 
 Website  
 Official Facebook

Chonburi F.C. seasons
Association football in Thailand lists